Jeffrey "Pedro" Hazel (born 20 September 1979) is a Saint Kitts and Nevis professional football manager.

Since August 2012 until April 2015 he was the coach of the Saint Kitts and Nevis national football team.

References

External links
Profile at Soccerway.com
Profile at Soccerpunter.com

1979 births
Living people
Saint Kitts and Nevis football managers
Saint Kitts and Nevis national football team managers
People from Basseterre